The Virgin of the Lilies, also known as The Madonna of the Lilies, is an 1899 oil painting by the French artist William-Adolphe Bouguereau, now owned by a private owner. Its dimensions are 27 × 18.5 cm.

References

 

1899 paintings
Paintings by William-Adolphe Bouguereau
Paintings of the Madonna and Child
19th-century allegorical paintings
Allegorical paintings by French artists